Bob Salpeter (born October 16, 1935) is an American graphic designer.

Education and early career
Bob Salpeter studied at the School of Industrial Art (1949–1953) and the School of Visual Arts in New York (1956–1958).

Salpeter worked at various design firms including Ben Lorenz Associates and the Bureau of Advertising before working for IBM (1960–1971) designing product literature and exhibits. With Arthur Appel in 1971, he programmed an IBM 360 to produce the first known computer-generated origami. At IBM, he was mentored by Paul Rand.

In 1972, Salpeter joined with Dick Lopez and founded Lopez Salpeter Design, producing a wide variety of graphic and exhibit design projects including the Human Variation Exhibition at The American Museum of Natural History and the History of Golf exhibit, at the World Golf Hall of Fame.

In 1979, he formed Salpeter Design now Salpeter Ventura working on design projects for clients such as IBM, Sony, American Express, and many financial companies such as Federated, Merrill Lynch, Oppenheimer Funds, and Goldman Sachs.

Teaching
Salpeter taught Graphic Communication at Pratt Institute (1985–2005).

Awards
He has received numerous design awards from the American Institute of Graphic  Arts, the Art Directors Club of New York, Type Directors Club and Design International in Paris, among others.

References

American graphic designers
Living people
1935 births
High School of Art and Design alumni
School of Visual Arts alumni